Naju station is a KTX & regional station in the city of Naju. It is on Honam Line.

External links
 Cyber station information from Korail

Railway stations in South Jeolla Province
Naju
Railway stations opened in 1913
Korea Train Express stations
1913 establishments in Korea